The Battle of Ptolemaida refers to two distinct engagements, the first around the village of Sotir north of Ptolemaida and the second around the village of Proasteion south of Ptolemaida, both fought on 13 April 1941 during the German invasion of Greece. These battles were delaying actions fought by Allied units under the overall command of the British 1st Armoured Brigade against the German 9th Panzer Division, to cover the Allied escape from their positions at Mt. Vermion toward the new defensive line of Mt.Olympus – river Aliakmon – Mt. Siniatsikon.

Footnotes 

1941 in Greece
Ptolemaida
Ptolemaida
Ptolemaida
Ptolemaida
April 1941 events